Cheeni Kum (Hindi for Less Sugar) is a 2007 Indian Hindi-language romantic comedy film directed by R. Balki and starring Amitabh Bachchan, Tabu, Paresh Rawal, Zohra Sehgal and Swini Khara.

Cheeni Kum premiered at the 2007 Cannes Film Festival on 21 May 2007, and premiered at the Leicester Square on 22 May 2007 and it released theatrically on 25 May 2007. Made on a production budget of  crore, it grossed a total of  crore at the box office, thus proving to be a commercial success. It received positive reviews from critics upon release, with praise for its direction, story, screenplay, dialogues, soundtrack and performances of the cast.

At the 53rd Filmfare Awards, Cheeni Kum received 1 award – Best Actress (Critics) (Tabu).

Plot 
Cheeni Kum focuses on Buddhadev Gupta (Amitabh Bachchan). Buddhadev is the 64-year-old chef and owner of London's top Indian restaurant, Spice 6. He lives with his 85-year-old mother (Zohra Sehgal) and his only friend and confidante is his 9-year-old neighbor, 'Sexy' (Swini Khara) who is diagnosed with cancer. Buddhadev is an arrogant, ego-centric, pompous man with a singular passion in life — cooking. He is a confirmed bachelor who has never been in love until 34-year-old Nina Verma (Tabu) walks into his restaurant and his life. Nina is a beautiful and charming Indian woman. Cool, calm, quiet, always smiling but independent and strong willed. The two contrasting in age, character and attitude, meet and against all odds, fall in love. They decide to get married and like any Indian man, Buddhadev respectfully comes to ask Nina's father, Omprakash Verma (Paresh Rawal), who is a true Gandhian living in Delhi, for her hand. The main problem here is that Buddhadev is older than Nina's father. Omprakash is horrified when Buddhadev asks his daughter's hand and refuses. He attempts to dissuade his daughter by going on a Gandhi-like hunger strike. Omprakash finally realizes his mistake and lets Nina have her way.

Cast
Amitabh Bachchan as Buddhadev Gupta
Tabu as Nina Verma
Paresh Rawal as Omprakash Verma
Zohra Sehgal as Buddhadev's mother
Swini Khara as Sexy
Alexx O'Nell as the English waiter

Soundtrack

The score and soundtrack were composed by Ilaiyaraaja. The songs had their tunes re-used from the composer's earlier songs in other languages, while the arrangements were fresh - such as "Jaane Do Na" was re-used version of the song "Jotheyali" from the 1981 Kannada movie Geetha.

Reception

Critical reception
Martin D'Souza of Glamsham gave the movie 4/5 stars, concluding that "There's a dash of sweetness (Tabu), the right amount of spice (Amitabh Bachchan), a proper dose of lime (Paresh Rawal), the perfect quantity of salt (Swini Khara) and a spoonful of tadka (Zohra Sehgal). A clean entertainer which can be watched by the entire family." Raja Sen of Rediff gave the movie 3.5/5 stars, stating that "This isn't a groundbreaking film, but it didn't set out to be. It's a maturely written film with great characters, tremendous performances and some fantastic moments. It could have been perfect, but the lesser said about that end the better. Watch it. A brilliant sequence involving the chef, a chemist, chhatris and chachas is absolute movie magic, and in itself well worth the price of admission. Bravo." Naresh Kumar Deoshi of Apun Ka Choice gave the movie 3/5 stars, saying that "The movie, featuring Amitabh Bachchan in yet another brilliant performance, not just entertains you with its sarcastic humor, it also touches your heart with its emotional moments. Do not miss this sugar-free spread." Taran Adarsh of Bollywood Hungama gave the movie 3/5 stars, concluding that "On the whole, CHEENI KUM is absorbing in parts. A lackluster first half gets a boost with a much energetic second half and that elevates the film to the watchable level. At the box-office, CHEENI KUM is targeted at the multiplexes mainly. Clever promos and feel-good vibes should ensure a positive run at the multiplexes." On the contrary, Rajeev Masand of CNN-IBN gave the movie 2/5 stars, stating that "So I'll go with two out of five for R. Balki's Cheeni Kum, it's an average entertainer at best. If you're a die-hard Bachchan fan, do give it a shot because he doesn't disappoint. How you wish the film didn't either!"

Box office
Cheeni Kum was a hit at the box office, grossing , despite taking a poor opening. The movie collected  net in its lifetime.

Accolades

Notes

References

External links

 Bonobology.com: "6 Bollywood movies where the lead characters have had a huge age difference"

2007 films
2000s Hindi-language films
2007 romantic comedy-drama films
Indian romantic comedy-drama films
Films set in London
Films shot in London
Cooking films
Films set in Delhi
Films directed by R. Balki
Films scored by Ilaiyaraaja
Sexuality and age in fiction
2007 directorial debut films